The Spanish goat, also called the brush goat or scrub goat, came originally from Spain via Mexico to the USA. It is now a meat and brush-clearing type found widely in the United States. In the Southeast and elsewhere, they are often referred to as "wood" (Florida), "brush" or "briar" (North Carolina, South Carolina), "hill" (Virginia), and "scrub" (midwest Pennsylvania) goats. Until recently, these goats were kept mainly for clearing brush and other undesirable plant species from pasture lands. The boer goats have overtaken Spanish goats for meat in the 1980s.

History
Around the 16th century, Spanish explorers brought landrace goats from their native lands to the Caribbean Islands and areas that would later become the United States and Mexico.  Some landrace Spanish goats exist in their native territory of Spain but survive through the bloodlines brought to the New World.

Spanish goats are hardy and can thrive in difficult environments.  Pure Spanish goats have been crossbred with imported goat breeds for cashmere and meat production.  Most crossbred goats show a “superb hybrid vigor.”  However, due to the amount of crossbreeding, Spanish goats are threatened, and appear on the American Livestock Breeds Conservancy watch list.

Characteristics
The Spanish goat has the ability to breed out of season, and is an excellent range animal because of its small udder and teats. In addition, Spanish goats are very hardy, able to survive and thrive under adverse agroclimatic conditions, with only limited management inputs. Within the general group of what are called "Spanish goats," there are those that are purely of Spanish origins, but the term has been used to represent an amalgam of all genotypes introduced to the area. There have been obvious infusions of dairy and Angora blood in many "Spanish" herds, but no organized attempt has ever been made to use them for milk or mohair production.

In recent years, the escalating demand for goat meat has focused research into the qualities of the Spanish goat as a meat goat. Spanish goats have shown excellent hardiness and have shown themselves to be a low-input goat compared to other meat breeds.
Several Spanish goat producers in Texas have been intensively selecting for increased meat production for the past several years. From information obtained from these producers, these "selected" Spanish goats appear to greatly outperform the ordinary Spanish goat used primarily for pasture maintenance.

Conservation status
When Boer goats were introduced into the United States from South Africa in the 1990s, many producers switched from raising Spanish goats to raising Boer or Boer crosses, which greatly reduced the population of Spanish goats. In 2009, there were approximately 8,500 purebred Spanish goats nationwide. They are now held to be a conservation priority by the American Livestock Breeds Conservancy, and in 2007 the Spanish Goat Association was organized to help conserve this breed.

Today, fieldwork has been able to identify various strains of purebred Spanish goats.  This fieldwork has been helpful in describing the different bloodlines and encourages development of a formal network of breeders.  The ALBC is still locating populations of the Spanish goats and trying to work to preserve those strains.  Recently there was an effort to preserve a strain found on an island off the coast of South Carolina.  This strain is one of two strains known to exist in the Southeast.

References

External links
 The Spanish Goat Association
 The American Livestock Breeds Conservancy

Meat goat breeds
Goat breeds originating in the United States
Conservation Priority Breeds of the Livestock Conservancy
Goat breeds